Labour of Love III is the twelfth album and third covers album by UB40, released on DEP International label in 1998.

Track listing
"Holly Holy" (original by Neil Diamond) 
"It's My Delight" (original by The Melodians)
"Come Back Darling" (original by Johnny Osbourne) 
"Never Let You Go" (original by Slim Smith)
"Soul Rebel" (original by Bob Marley)
"My Best Girl" (original by The Paragons)
"Good Ambition" (original by The Ethiopians)
"The Train Is Coming" (original by Ken Boothe) 
"Blood and Fire" (original by Niney the Observer)
"Mr. Fix It" (original by Winston Francis)
"Stay a Little Bit Longer" (original by Delano Stewart)
"Someone Like You" (original by  The Mighty Diamonds)
"The Time Has Come" (original by Slim Smith) 
"Crying Over You" (original by Ken Boothe)
"Legalize It" (original by Peter Tosh)
"Brahm's Lullaby" (hidden track which follows silence after "Legalize It")

Certifications

References

1998 albums
UB40 albums
Covers albums
Virgin Records albums